Sławkowska Street (Polish: Ulica Sławkowska) - a historic street in Kraków, Poland. The street was formerly part of the Sławków Royal Route.

The oldest document recording the street's existence originates from 1307 under the name Slacovse gasse. Formerly, the northern point of the street was enclosed by the Sławkowska Gate and a bulwark. During the urban modernisation of Kraków (1817-1822), the city walls and the gatehouse were deconstructed. The street ends by the Planty Park with Basztowa Street (Ulica Basztowa, lit. Tower Street), where it continues as Długa Street (Ulica Długa, lit. Long Street).

Features

References

Streets in Kraków